Lyrical Assault is a Canadian hip hop group, formed in 2002 in Montreal, Quebec.

Biography 
Since 2002, the circle of friends (COF) meets in the basement of Tolerance Zer0 (Nicholas Legault) in Vaudreuil-Dorion for freestyling and produces their own songs. The group became experimental in a new form of music called "Sproat Hop" and made its first performance in front of a live audience at the Sproat Hip Hop show in June 2002. They quickly made their place on the Sproat rap scene in Montreal and performed in local venues coveted by emerging groups such as Bourbon Street West, Manchester bar, Les Foufounes Électriques, the Alizé, Chez Maurice (featuring Muzion), Saints Showbar, Club Soda.

Meanwhile, members of the group also perform as a duo or solo, in competitions where they were finalists in all of the following contests: Urban Synergy 2005, Hip-hop 4Ever 2005, La Boom 2007.

Contest
In November 2007, Lyrical Assault participates at the national final of the Global Battle of the Bands (GBOB) presented to the "Foufounes électriques", bringing eighteen bands from Quebec and Ontario. The Montreal formation won the first place, followed by the grand final of the international Global Battle of the Bands in London, where they represent Canada.

During the performance, eleven musicians on stage: Pierre-Luc Fortin (DJ Passan) DJ, Nicholas Legault (Zer0 Tolerance aka Nick Lucas) English MC, Denis Langlois (R-Tikk) French MC, Jean-Sebastien Baciu (J-Fresh) bass guitar, Alexis Arbour guitar, Alisa Charles vocals, Arisa Safu saxophone and guitar, Charles Alexi Masse (Charley Brown) Franch MC, Francois Thiffault (Horny Frank) soprano / tenor / bariton saxophone and western concert flute, Marc-André Decelles (MADD) drums.

Discography 
 2007 : Funk for your trunk (DJ Passan et Zer0 Tolerance)
 2006 : Make the speakers bleed (Tolerance et Charley Brown)
 2006 : L'usine des rêves (R-Tikk with participation of DJ Passan)
 2005 : Let it be known (Zer0 Tolerance)
 2005 : Apex Mundi - Nouvelle génération
 2004 : La Cave Vol.2 (compilation)
 2004 : While you waiting LP
 2004 : Let it be known EP (Zer0 Tolerance)
 2003 : Apex Mundi - Nouvelle génération
 2003 : Stricly Hip hop
 2003 : The Zer0 Tolerance EP

References

External links
 Lyrical Assault Official Web site

Musical groups established in 2002
Musical groups from Montreal
Canadian hip hop groups
2002 establishments in Quebec